Plectembolus is a genus of Southeast Asian sheet weavers that was first described by Alfred Frank Millidge & A. Russell-Smith in 1992.

Species
 it contains five species, found in Indonesia, Malaysia, the Philippines, and on the Sumatra:
Plectembolus biflectus Millidge & Russell-Smith, 1992 – Philippines
Plectembolus quadriflectus Millidge & Russell-Smith, 1992 (type) – Malaysia (mainland), Indonesia (Sumatra)
Plectembolus quinqueflectus Millidge & Russell-Smith, 1992 – Malaysia, Indonesia (Sumatra)
Plectembolus similis Millidge & Russell-Smith, 1992 – Indonesia (Sumatra)
Plectembolus triflectus Millidge & Russell-Smith, 1992 – Malaysia

See also
 List of Linyphiidae species (I–P)

References

Araneomorphae genera
Linyphiidae
Spiders of Asia